Daniel H. Coakley (July 12, 1906 – March 26, 1964) was an American insurance salesman and a member of the Massachusetts House of Representatives.

Early life
Coakley was born on July 12, 1906 in Boston. His father, Daniel H. Coakley, was a prominent politician. Coakley graduated from Boston College High School and the College of the Holy Cross. He later attended Fordham Law School and graduated from Boston University Law School in 1935. He then became a legal clerk to Massachusetts Attorney General Paul A. Dever.

Massachusetts House of Representatives
In 1936, Coakley ran in the special election to fill the vacancy caused by the death of state representative Leo Birmingham. He defeated eight other candidates to win the Democratic nomination and won the general election by a 4 to 1 margin. He was elected to a full term later that year.

During World War II, Coakley served in the United States Coast Guard.

Insurance
In 1946, Coakley joined New York Life Insurance Company. He eventually obtained $1 million in sales a year. In 1957, he was the top salesman in his company with $5 million in sales.

Death
Coakley died on March 26, 1964 in Peter Bent Brigham Hospital.

See also
 1937–1938 Massachusetts legislature

References

20th-century American politicians
American businesspeople in insurance
American salespeople
Boston University School of Law alumni
College of the Holy Cross alumni
Massachusetts lawyers
Democratic Party members of the Massachusetts House of Representatives
People from Boston
1906 births
1964 deaths
Boston College High School alumni
20th-century American lawyers